Synaphobranchus calvus is an eel in the family Synaphobranchidae (cutthroat eels). It was described by Marcelo Roberto Souto de Melo in 2007.

The species epithet "calvus" means "bald" in Latin, and refers to the lack of scales on the eel's head.

It is a marine, tropical eel which is known from Brazil, in the southern Atlantic Ocean.

References

External links
 

Synaphobranchidae
Fish described in 2007